Brigadier General Walter Robert Butler Doran,  (15 December 1861 – 6 February 1945) was a highly decorated senior British Army officer who served with distinction in the Second Boer War, commanding an infantry battalion. He was a brigade commander during the First World War.

Military career 
William Doran was recorded as being at the Royal Military Academy Sandhurst on 3 April 1881. He was commissioned as a subaltern in Her Majesty's Royal Irish Rifles on 10 May 1882. He deployed with his regiment to Egypt and took part in the Anglo-Egyptian War of 1882 and later the Sudan Expedition of 1884-85. In late November 1899 he took part in the operations leading to the defeat of the Khalifa, and for his services in the Sudan he received the brevet rank of lieutenant-colonel on 14 March 1900.

South Africa 
Colonel Doran took part in the Boer War, and afterwards served as General Staff Officer, 1st Grade, in 5th Division, part of the Irish Command. During his time on this staff he was made a Companion of the Order of the Bath (CB) in the 1910 Birthday Honours.

From 8 April 1912 to 4 August 1914 he commanded the 2nd Battalion the Prince of Wales's Leinster Regiment (Royal Canadians).

First World War 
Doran took command of 17th Infantry Brigade, which included his previous regiment as part of its order of battle. The brigade deployed to France as part of the 6th Infantry Division and the BEF.  His brother Beauchamp Doran was also a Brigadier General, commanding the 8th Infantry Brigade at the same time.
 
He was awarded the Military Order of Savoy on 12 September 1919 by the then Kingdom of Italy.

Later life 
Doran retired as a Honorary Brigadier on 4 March 1919. The Dorans owned Down House, Redlynch, near Salisbury. The house still stands, although it is now reduced in size. Brigadier Doran died at Down House on 6 February 1945. An obituary appeared in The Times on 9 February.

Family 
Doran married Elsie Teichmann in 1911. The couple had one son: John Desmond Beauchamp Doran (known as Desmond), who went on to join the Secret Intelligence Service and later the Intelligence Corps in World War II. Desmond Doran died in 1946 in Palestine during a Zionist terrorist attack on his house in Tel Aviv/Jaffa. Elsie Doran died at Down House in 1966.

References 

1861 births
1945 deaths
Graduates of the Royal Military College, Sandhurst
Companions of the Distinguished Service Order
Companions of the Order of the Bath
British Army personnel of the Second Boer War
British Army generals of World War I
Royal Ulster Rifles officers
British Army personnel of the Anglo-Egyptian War
British Army personnel of the Mahdist War
Prince of Wales's Leinster Regiment officers
Officers of the Military Order of Savoy
British Army brigadiers
Military personnel of British India